The Meyers Me-165W was a tandem-seat trainer designed for the American Civilian Pilot Training Program requirement during the Second World War.

Design and development

The Me-165W was a wire-braced, low-wing, open cockpit, tandem seat, monoplane with conventional landing gear. The fuselage was constructed from welded steel tubing with aircraft fabric covering. The wings used wooden spars and ribs with fabric covering. The wings were wire braced, with a slight gull wing profile.

The Me-165W was test flown for six months. The aircraft showed little improvement over Meyer's other trainer, the OTW. Meyers claimed the aircraft performed poorly. The program was canceled, the prototype was abandoned at the factory and later destroyed by a tornado.

Specifications (Me-165W)

See also

References

World War II trainer aircraft of the United States
Low-wing aircraft